House-museum of Vagif Mustafazadeh is a memorial museum of the Azerbaijani jazz-pianist and composer, Vagif Mustafazadeh, and it was established on July 28, 1989. In 1994, it became a branch of the Azerbaijan State Museum of Musical Culture. From 1989 to 1997, the director of the museum was Zivar Agasaf qizi Aliyeva.

The house-museum consists of three rooms containing 1214 artifacts including photos, posters, gramophone discs, documents, and personal belongings connected with the life and work of Vagif Mustafazade.
Vagif Mustafazadeh is father of Azerbaijani singer and pianist Aziza Mustafa Zadeh.

At present, the museum is led by the musician’s cousin, Afag Agha Rahim gizi Aliyeva. She's also a founder and chairman of the Cultural and Charitable Foundation, named after Vagif Mustafazadeh.

References

Museums in Baku
1989 establishments in Azerbaijan
Museums established in 1989